Zasele Peak is the ice-covered peak rising to 1250 m in the southeast foothills of Detroit Plateau on Nordenskjöld Coast in Graham Land, Antarctica, situated between the upper courses of Polaris and Pyke Glaciers.  It has precipitous and partly ice free west slopes.

The peak is named after the settlement of Zasele in Western Bulgaria.

Location

Map
 Antarctic Digital Database (ADD). Scale 1:250000 topographic map of Antarctica. Scientific Committee on Antarctic Research (SCAR), 1993–2016.

References
 Zasele Peak. SCAR Composite Antarctic Gazetteer.
 Bulgarian Antarctic Gazetteer. Antarctic Place-names Commission. (details in Bulgarian, basic data in English)

External links
 Zasele Peak. Copernix satellite image

Mountains of Graham Land
Nordenskjöld Coast
Bulgaria and the Antarctic